Laura Brent (born 2 May 1988) is an Australian actress, best known for her role as Lilliandil in The Chronicles of Narnia: The Voyage of the Dawn Treader.

Born in Melbourne, Brent attended the National Institute of Dramatic Art, where she trained as an actress and a singer and graduated in 2007. She made her first screen appearance in the 2009 short film Message from the CEO and went on to making guest appearances on the Australian television series Chandon Pictures, Legend of the Seeker and Rescue: Special Ops. In 2010, she rose to international fame when she made her feature film debut as Lilliandil in the third installment of The Chronicles of Narnia film series, The Voyage of the Dawn Treader.

In the Mortal Kombat reboot, she played role of Allison Young, the wife of the film's protagonist Cole Young.

Filmography

Film

Television

Short film

Sources

External links

1988 births
Living people
Australian film actresses
Actresses from Melbourne
National Institute of Dramatic Art alumni